Mariano Vidal Molina (23 October 1925 – 20 February 1996) was an Argentinian actor.

He appeared along Antonio Parra and Gustavo Re in The Corruption of Chris Miller (1973), by Juan Antonio Bardem, Carola de día, Carola de noche (1969), by Jaime de Armiñán, along Frank Braña, Charito Tejero, José Canalejas, Tomás Blanco and Jorge Vico in Secret of Captain O'Hara, by Arturo Ruiz Castillo.

Filmography

TV series

References

External links
 

1925 births
1996 deaths
Argentine male film actors
Argentine male stage actors
Argentine male television actors
Argentine male radio actors